John Rodney Santos (born May 30, 1973) is a Filipino coach and retired professional basketball player. He is also known as The Slasher for his slashing ability going to the basket.

Collegiate career

Santos played for the San Sebastian high school and college teams from 1991 to 1995, winning the Most Valuable Player award in 1994.

Professional career

After a storied college career at San Sebastian, Santos was drafted second overall by Purefoods in the 1996 draft. Then he was traded to Alaska for Cris Bolado and Bryant Punzalan in 1997 and became one of Tim Cone's reliable contributors off the bench.  He was re-acquired by Purefoods in 2003 as a free agent.  After his stint with the TJ Hotdogs, he was then traded to Ginebra, and was a vital cog in coach Siot Tanquincen's rotation. His last stop was with the Coca-Cola Tigers before nagging injuries forced him into retirement.

Career Statistics

Season-by-Season Averages
Accurate as of 2009

|-
| align="left" | 1996
| align="left" | Purefoods
| 49 ||	15.8 ||	0.458 || 0.158 || 0.720 || 1.2 || 1.2 || 0.8 || 0.2 || 6.8
|-
| align="left" | 1997
| align="left" | Alaska
| 34 ||	10.4 ||	0.483 || 0.000 || 0.625 || 1.0 || 0.7 || 0.2 || 0.2 || 3.9
|-
| align="left" | 1998
| align="left" | Alaska
| 65 || 22.7 ||	0.472 || 0.000 || 0.765 || 2.4 || 1.5 || 0.7 || 0.3 || 7.2
|-
| align="left" | 1999
| align="left" | Alaska
| 56 || 22.0 ||	0.530 || 0.000 || 0.663 || 2.1 || 1.7 || 0.8 || 0.3 || 8.2
|-
| align="left" | 2000
| align="left" | Alaska
| 49 || 25.5 ||	0.510 || 0.250 || 0.670 || 2.4 || 1.8 || 1.0 || 0.2 || 11.1
|-
| align="left" | 2000
| align="left" | Alaska
| 45 ||	28.8 ||	0.445 || 0.250 || 0.782 || 2.6 || 2.1 || 0.9 ||	0.2 || 8.5
|-
| align="left" | 2001
| align="left" | Alaska
| 45 || 28.8 || 0.445 || 0.250 || 0.782 || 2.6 || 2.1 || 0.9 || 0.2 || 8.5
|-
| align="left" | 2002
| align="left" | Alaska
| 59 ||	19.4 ||	0.431 || 0.356 || 0.723 || 2.1 || 1.3 || 0.7 || 0.1 || 5.7
|-
| align="left" | 2003
| align="left" | Purefoods
| 36 || 22.0 || 0.393 || 0.293 || 0.690 || 2.1 || 1.6 || 0.9 || 0.2 || 7.6
|-
| align="left" | 2004-05
| align="left" | Brgy. Ginebra
| 78 || 31.0 ||	0.437 || 0.279 || 0.776 || 2.7 || 2.8 || 1.1 || 0.3 || 9.9
|-
| align="left" | 2005-06
| align="left" | Brgy. Ginebra
| 32 || 25.2 ||	0.383 || 0.282 || 0.699	|| 2.3 || 1.8 || 0.8 || 0.1 || 7.8
|-
| align="left" | 2006-07
| align="left" | Brgy. Ginebra
| 19 || 13.1 || 0.404 || 0.353 || 0.667 || 0.9 || 0.7 || 0.5 || 0.0 || 4.4
|-
| align="left" | 2007-08
| align="left" | Brgy. Ginebra
| 2 || 7.5 || 0.400 || 0.500 || - || 1.0 || 0.5 || 0.0 || 0.0 || 3.5
|-
| align="left" | 2008-09
| align="left" | Coca-Cola
| 12 ||	7.8 ||	0.381 || 0.167 || 1.000 || 0.8 || 0.4 || 0.0 || 0.0 || 2.4
|-
| align="left" | Career
| align="left" |
| 536 || 22.2 || 0.460 || 0.283 || 0.721 || 2.1 || 1.7 || 0.8 || 0.2 || 7.6

Coaching career

Santos served as part of San Sebastian's coaching staff. He entered the Stags coaching staff after coach Topex Robinson returned to the team for a second spell as coach in 2013. In 2015, he was officially named head coach of the Stags, replacing Robinson. He also coached the PBA D-League team, ATC Livermarin.

References 

1973 births
Living people
Alaska Aces (PBA) players
Barangay Ginebra San Miguel players
Basketball players from Bulacan
Filipino men's basketball coaches
Magnolia Hotshots players
San Sebastian Stags basketball players
Philippine Basketball Association All-Stars
Philippines men's national basketball team players
Filipino men's basketball players
People from Meycauayan
Powerade Tigers players
Small forwards
Shooting guards
Magnolia Hotshots draft picks
San Sebastian Stags basketball coaches
UP Fighting Maroons basketball coaches
UST Growling Tigers basketball coaches